The 1900 United States House of Representatives elections in South Carolina was held on Tuesday November 6, to elected seven United States Representatives of South Carolina. Five Democratic incumbents were re-elected and two incumbents were defeated in the primaries, but the seats were retained by the Democrats.  The composition of South Carolina delegation after the election was solely Democratic.

1st congressional district
Incumbent Democratic Congressman William Elliott of the 1st congressional district, in office since 1897, defeated Republican challenger W.W. Beckett.

General election results

|-
| 
| colspan=5 |Democratic hold
|-

2nd congressional district
Incumbent Democratic Congressman W. Jasper Talbert of the 2nd congressional district, in office since 1893, defeated Republican challenger J.B. Odom.

General election results

|-
| 
| colspan=5 |Democratic hold
|-

3rd congressional district
Incumbent Democratic Congressman Asbury Latimer of the 3rd congressional district, in office since 1893, won the Democratic primary and defeated Republican challenger Anson C. Merrick in the general election.

Democratic primary

General election results

|-
| 
| colspan=5 |Democratic hold
|-

4th congressional district
Incumbent Democratic Congressman Stanyarne Wilson of the 4th congressional district, in office since 1895, was defeated in the Democratic primary by Joseph T. Johnson.  He defeated Republican challenger S.T. Poinier in the general election.

Democratic primary

General election results

|-
| 
| colspan=5 |Democratic hold
|-

5th congressional district
Incumbent Democratic Congressman David E. Finley of the 5th congressional district, in office since 1899, defeated Thomas J. Strait in the Democratic primary and Republican John F. Jones in the general election.

Democratic primary

General election results

|-
| 
| colspan=5 |Democratic hold
|-

6th congressional district
Incumbent Democratic Congressman James Norton of the 6th congressional district, in office since 1897, was defeated in the Democratic primary by Robert B. Scarborough.  He defeated Republican R.A. Stuart in the general election.

Democratic primary

General election results

|-
| 
| colspan=5 |Democratic hold
|-

7th congressional district
Incumbent Democratic Congressman J. William Stokes of the 7th congressional district, in office since 1896, defeated Republican challenger Alexander D. Dantzler.

General election results

|-
| 
| colspan=5 |Democratic hold
|-

See also
United States House of Representatives elections, 1900
South Carolina gubernatorial election, 1900
South Carolina's congressional districts

References

"Report of M.R. Cooper, Secretary of State, to the General Assembly of South Carolina." Reports and Resolutions of the General Assembly of the State of South Carolina. Volume I. Columbia, SC: The State Company, 1901, pp. 80–81.

1900
South Carolina
United States House of Representatives